"Sign of the Gypsy Queen" is a song written and originally recorded by Lorence Hud. The song became a hit in Canada when released as a single in 1973. Hud's version appeared on his eponymous debut album. The song reached the top 5 on the West Coast, #3 on CJRW-FM in Summerside, Prince Edward Island, and peaked at #16 nationally on the RPM 100 chart.

April Wine version

April Wine had more success with a hard rock version of the song in 1981. It was the second single from their album The Nature of the Beast. The song reached #40 on the Canadian Hot 100, and #57 in the United States on the Billboard Hot 100, and #19 on the Mainstream Rock Tracks. 

This version has become popular on album-oriented rock radio stations, getting frequent airplay in the United States and Canada. A music video aired on MTV's first day of broadcast. It remains one of the group's signature songs and a live concert staple. The song has since been recorded by other artists.

Background
The song was first recorded by Hud at RCA's Toronto Studios in 1971, with Bill Misener of The Paupers producing. Bill wanted to sign Lorence but RCA did not move quickly enough, so A&M signed him instead. On Hud's recording he played all the instruments himself.

In popular culture
"Sign of the Gypsy Queen" gained a brief resurgence in popularity when it was featured in an episode of the American television series Breaking Bad in 2013. The episode, "Granite State", received critical acclaim, and is one of the most popular episodes in the series history.

Charts

References

1981 singles
1972 songs
April Wine songs
Aquarius Records (Canada) singles
Capitol Records singles